The London International Awards, or LIA (formerly known as London International Advertising Awards, LIAA), is one of the world's leading award shows that honor creativity in the advertising and brand communications space.  Held and judged in Las Vegas annually in October, it also hosts Creative LIAisons; a free-to-attend, by-invitation-only development program for young creative talent currently working in the industry.  The selected guests have the opportunity to hear from some of the thought leaders from around the world as a way to develop their talent and skill base.

A woman-owned company, LIA is one of five global shows included in the WARC Creative 100 Rankings.

History 
The International Awards, founded in the United Kingdom in 1986 by President Barbara Levy, began by celebrating advertising in the realms of cinema, television, print, outdoor and radio, evolving since its inception into 27 unique media types: Ambient & Activation, Billboard, Branded Content & Entertainment, Creativity in Business-to-Business, Creative Use of Data, Creativity in the Metaverse, Creativity in PR, Design, Digital, Evolution, Health & Wellness, Health & Wellness – Craft, Integration, Music & Sound, Music Video, Non-Traditional, Online Film, Package Design, Pharma & Medical, Pharma & Medical – Craft, Poster, Print, Production & Post-Production, Radio & Audio, Social Media & Influencers, Television/Cinema, and Transformative Business Impact.

It was the first international advertising award of its kind to acknowledge all media and methods from around the world to be judged by a diverse global jury.

In 2004, the word "Advertising" was removed from the competition's name to reflect the fact that it observes more than just "advertising" in an ever-changing industry.

In 2009, LIA, along with Faris Yakob, author of Paid Attention: Innovative Advertising for a Digital World and co-founder of Genius/Steals, developed "The NEW," for works that demonstrate concepts that don't fit comfortably among the standard media divisions, with a focus in fields of technology. In 2021, The NEW was renamed Evolution.

In 2014, LIA added Branded Entertainment as a medium. The judging category, first chaired by Jimmy Smith of Amusement Park Entertainment, awards "creativity and the power of the idea across films, television programming, live events, audio, gaming and music videos that engage consumers by entertaining them, rather than through traditional advertising." The Branded Entertainment competition became Branded Content & Entertainment in 2023.

2017 included the additions of a Health & Pharma competition in response to a "large number of requests from creatives"; a Social Media & Influencers medium "based on Creativity and Engagement", and the LIA Chinese Creativity Show featuring a unique red statue and executed through a first round of judging in China and a final judging session simultaneous with the annual LIA Judging. (See: Judging)

2019 saw the introduction of Podcasts as a medium. LIA was also added to the WARC Creative 100 Rankings, successor to the Gunn 100, which tracks the performance of campaigns, brands and agencies in advertising creativity competitions around the world. The rankings are a benchmark for creative excellence, allowing marketers to compare their performance with their peers. As of 2023, Podcasts is no longer a separate competition and is part of the Radio & Audio category.

For the first time in its history, LIA cancelled the 2020 Awards season due to the global COVID-19 Pandemic.

The 2021 Awards Festival saw the addition of a Creative Use of Data competition and Transformative Business Impact competition. The NEW was renamed to Evolution to better reflect the values of the category.

2021 also saw the company appoint Terry Savage, former Chairman of the Cannes Lions International Festival of Creativity, as Chairman of LIA.

The 2022 Awards Festival introduced the Creativity in PR competition and the Creativity in the Metaverse competition.

The 2023 Awards Festival will see the addition of a Creativity in Business-to-Business competition.

LIA has one main office in New York City.

Judging 

As of 2022, the sixteen LIA Jury panels, each one headed by a Jury President, are composed of nearly 150 experienced members of agencies, production companies, design houses, and technology companies. These panels decide on the Gold, Silver and Bronze Statue Winners as well as the finalists.  Each Jury is given the non-compulsory opportunity to award a Grand LIA to a piece of work that has achieved a Gold statue.

The Public Service/Social Awareness Grand LIA was created in 2019, following the same rules as the original Grand LIA, but only offered to all Gold Public Service winners. In 2022, in the media of Health & Wellness and Pharma & Medical, the Gold Winners for Public Service/Social Responsibility will be judged for one potential Health & Pharma Public Service/Social Responsibility Grand LIA by both juries.

The judging process is unique in that each Juror sees every piece of work entered within the medium/media that he or she is required to judge. It is also required that all jurors are on site for judging from the first round through statue discussions; this ensures that all jurors see every piece of work.  LIA has no quotas for winners, and every juror is fully aware of all winners when judging is completed.

LIA is the only awards show that allows the press and young creatives full access to the jury rooms during judging, including statue discussions. This allows for complete transparency in LIA results.

Judging is held annually in Las Vegas over a 7-to-10-day period in late September/early October.

Awards 

In 1985, LIA commissioned a British art student, Mary Griffiths, to design the LIA statue. The 17" LIA statue is a winged figure that is hand cast in metal prior to a gold, silver, bronze, black (for Grand LIA winners), red (Chinese Creativity Festival) or Blue (for Regional Winners) plating. It stands on a custom black nickel finished base with an engraved plate displaying the year, medium, category, client/brand and the recipient's name and location.

For 26 years, LIA held its one-night awards ceremony in London.  For the first time in 2010, the same year as the Awards' 25th Anniversary, LIA awarded global Network of the Year, Agency of the Year, and Production Company of the Year designations. Subsequently, in 2011, LIA added Post-Production Company of the Year,  Design Company of the Year, Independent Agency of the Year, Music & Sound Company of the Year and Radio & Audio Company of the Year  have also been recognized in recent years. 2018 saw Health & Pharma Network of the Year, Health Agency of the Year, and Pharma Agency of the Year, followed by Client of the Year in 2019 and Independent Network of the Year, Independent Health Agency of the Year, Independent Pharma Agency of the Year and Independent Health & Pharma Network of the Year in 2021.

In 2011, LIA gave a one-off award sponsored by JetBlue to filmmaker Morgan Spurlock's POM Wonderful Presents: The Greatest Movie Ever Sold, dubbed "The Greatest Award Ever Sold" for its analysis of product placement and the inner workings of the ad industry.

In 2012, it was decided to allocate the budget for the ceremony in favor of bringing a small group of young International Creatives from around the world together to share their experiences and to discuss the future of advertising, design, production, brand-building and the overall state of the creative global markets. (See: Creative LIAisons)

In 2017, LIA added Regional 'Of the Year' Awards to Australia / New Zealand; Asia; Europe; North America; the Middle East / Africa; South America as additional components of its global 'Of the Year' honours.

2022 saw In-House ‘Of the Year' Awards for Regional and Global.

2023 will introduce the Created for Creatives LIA Legend Award.

In past years, LIA has published a hardbound, full-color Annual showcasing all of the winners and finalists from that given year.

Creative LIAisons 
In 2012, as a way of giving back to the industry, LIA launched an educational initiative called 'Creative Conversations'.  The inaugural program consisted of approximately 60 young creatives who were able to have round table discussions with: Susan Credle, Israel Diaz, Sonal Dabral, Tony Calcao, Jeremy Craigen, Faris Yakob, Neil French, Dörte Spengler-Ahrens, Jonathon Ker, Ralph van Dijk, and Scott Elias among others.

In 2015, the program was renamed Creative LIAisons and was rebranded by Napath Omathikul of Leo Burnett. The event typically hosts approximately 100 Young Creatives ages 21 to 30 from around the globe consists of panel discussions, interactive workshops, seminars that are not only industry centric but also touch on topics that are relevant to today's culture and lifestyle, brand building and future worldwide trends. All expenses for travel and hotel accommodations are fully funded by LIA.

As Creative LIAisons runs concurrently with LIA Judging, attendees receive one-on-one mentoring from many of the LIA jurors. LIA is the only show that allows these attendees unlimited access to the jury and the invaluable experience to sit in on statue discussions as they occur in real time.

LIA does not directly select the attendees. Instead, LIA allocates seats to industry associations, media partners and companies that support the awards festival through entries, as a way to nurture, educate and honor young creative stars, in addition to regional competitions and self-nomination. Since 2012, over 700 young creatives have had the opportunity to participate in the program.

Some luminaries in their respective fields that have presented at Creative LIAisons are: Rob Belgiovane, former Group CCO, BWM Dentsu; Matt Eastwood, Global Chief Creative Officer, McCann; Bob Isherwood, former Worldwide Creative Director, Saatchi & Saatchi; Diane Jackson, Chief Production Officer, DDB; Pum Lefebure, Co-founder and Chief Creative Officer, Design Army, Matt MacDonald, Executive Creative Director, BBDO;  Piyush Pandey, Chief Creative Officer Worldwide and Executive Chairman India, Ogilvy, Malcolm Poynton, Global Chief Creative Officer, Cheil Worldwide Network, Doerte Spengler-Ahrens, CCO, Jung von Matt/SAGA, Mark Tutssel, former Leo Burnett Executive Chairman, Susan Credle, Chief Creative Officer, FCB Global; Ralph van Dijk, Founder of Eardrum Australia, Taras Wayner, Chief Creative Officer, North America, Wunderman Thompson, Jeremy Craigen, former Chief Creative Officer, Innocean Worldwide; Lara Logan, as well as previous Keynote Speaker Daymond John and many more.

The following are some past featured panels:

 Branded - Content vs. Entertainment? Featuring: Raphael Aflalo, Mel Clements, Jesse Coulter, Lizie Gower, Jonathon Ker, Jimmy Smith
 The Audio Boom Featuring: Tom Eymundson, Jill Kershaw, Ralph van Dijk
 Verbal Identity - What Is It? Featuring: Rachel Bernard, Sean Doyle, Steve Martin, Chris West, Ben Zimmer 
 A Women's Journey Featuring Susan Credle, Laura Gregory, Karen Howe, Merlee Jayme, Rosie Yakob
 Where is all the Branded Entertainment? Featuring: Sonal Dabral, Kerstin Emhoff, Perry Fair, Dennis Lueck, John McKelvey, Jimmy Smith

The following are some past featured workshops:

 6-Second Workshop by Great Guns
 InnerVation Lab presented by the Shark Group featuring Daymond John
 Rare Access sponsored by Sweetshop and Google

In 2021, as a response to the COVID-19 pandemic, Creative LIAisons morphed into a series of global virtual one-to-one coaching and networking sessions for young creatives. The program resumed in-person sessions running concurrently with LIA judging in 2022. In 2023, LIA plans to continue Creative LIAisons with both virtual and in-person sessions.

References

External links 
 

International awards
Advertising awards
Communication design
Awards established in 1986
1986 establishments in England
Arts awards in the United Kingdom